Pokémon the Series: XY Kalos Quest is the eighteenth season of the Pokémon anime series, and the second season of Pokémon the Series: XY, known in Japan as . It originally aired in Japan from November 6, 2014, to October 22, 2015, on TV Tokyo, and in the United States from February 7 to December 19, 2015, on Cartoon Network.

Set in the Kalos region, the season follows the adventures of the Pokémon trainer Ash Ketchum, Serena, Clemont and his sister Bonnie as Ash and his Pikachu collect Gym Badges to compete in the Kalos League and as Pokémon Performer Serena wins Princess Keys from Pokémon Showcases so she can enter the Pokémon Showcase Master Class.

The episodes were directed by Tetsuo Yajima and produced by the animation studio OLM.

The Japanese opening songs are  performed by Yusuke Kaiji for 6 episodes, and  performed by Tomohisa Sako for 39 episodes. The ending songs are  performed by Shoko Nakagawa for 19 episodes,  performed by Little Glee Monster for 26 episodes, and the English opening song is "Be a Hero", performed by Ben Dixon and The Sad Truth, featuring composer Ed Goldfarb. Its instrumental version serves as the ending theme.

This is the only dubbed Pokémon season whose subtitle is used only in the DVD releases and not used within the episodes' openings themselves (excluding the first two seasons, referred to simply as "Pokémon" during their first original airings).



Episode list

Home media releases 
Viz Media and Warner Home Video have released the series in the United States on two three-disc volume sets.

The first volume was released on July 12, 2016, and contains 22 episodes and the second was released on December 13, 2016, and contains 23 episodes.

Notes

References

External links 
 Pokémon anime website at TV Tokyo 
 Pokémon XY page at Pokémon JP official website 
 Pokémon TV Anime at Pokémon JP official website 

2014 Japanese television seasons
2015 Japanese television seasons
Season18